"Your New Cuckoo" is a song from the Cardigans' third studio album, First Band on the Moon. Released on 25 August 1997, the song reached number 35 on the UK Singles Chart the same month.

Formats and track listings
"Your New Cuckoo", "Lovefool", and "Hey! Get Out of My Way" were written by Nina Persson and Peter Svensson; "Country Hell", "I Figured Out", "After All", "Rise and Shine", and "Sick and Tired" were written by Magnus Sveningsson and Svensson; "Carnival" was written by Persson, Sveningsson, and Svensson.
 Swedish 12-inch vinyl 
A1. "Your New Cuckoo" 
B1. "Your New Cuckoo" 
B2. "Your New Cuckoo" 

 European CD single 
 "Your New Cuckoo"  – 3:30
 "Country Hell" – 2:45

 European maxi-CD single 
 "Your New Cuckoo"  – 3:30
 "Country Hell" – 2:45
 "I Figured Out"  – 2:04
 "After All"  – 2:36

 UK CD1 
 "Your New Cuckoo"  – 3:30
 "Your New Cuckoo"  – 9:24
 "Your New Cuckoo"  – 3:52

 UK CD2 
 "Your New Cuckoo"  – 3:30
 "I Figured Out"  – 2:04
 "After All"  – 2:36
 "Lovefool"  – 3:17

 Australian CD single 
 "Your New Cuckoo"  – 3:30
 "Your New Cuckoo"  – 9:24
 "Your New Cuckoo"  – 3:52
 "Country Hell" – 2:47

 Japanese limited-edition 7-inch EP 
A1. "Your New Cuckoo"
A2. "Carnival"
B1. "Rise and Shine"
B2. "Hey! Get Out of My Way"
B3. "Sick & Tired"

Credits and personnel
Credits adapted from the liner notes of First Band on the Moon.

Musicians
 Nina Persson – lead vocals
 Peter Svensson – guitar
 Magnus Sveningsson – bass
 Lars-Olof Johansson – keyboards
 Bengt Lagerberg – drums and percussion

Additional musicians and technical personnel
 Åsa Håkansson – violin
 Maria Holm – violin
 Tore Johansson – engineering and production
 Roger Jonsson – mastering
 Lynette Koyana – backing vocals
 Mattias Svensson – violin
 David Wilczewski – flute
 Inga Zeppezauer – violin

Charts

References

The Cardigans songs
1996 songs
1997 singles
Mercury Records singles
Songs written by Nina Persson
Songs written by Peter Svensson
Stockholm Records singles